Lignac (Limousin: Linhac) is a commune in the Indre department in central France.

Location
Lignac is located in the southwest corner of the department. It borders the ancient regions of Berry, Poitou, and La Marche in the foothills of the Massif Central. The village lies within the parc naturel régional de la Brenne, a region noted for its lakes and wildlife. The river Anglin forms part of the commune's eastern border.

History
The name Lignac is probably of Roman origin. During the Roman occupation a wealthy landowner named Linius apparently lived in the area; there are source references to Liniacum and Villa Linii. Within the commune lies the hamlet of Château Guillaume, which was a commune in its own right up until 1829. The château was at its height between 1087 and 1112 AD when it was the home of William IX, Duke of Aquitaine. It was said to be the home of Eleanor of Aquitaine, consort of King Louis VII of France and King Henry II of England.

The Château of Lignac was constructed during the 15th century in the centre of the village. All that remains today are the feet of two pillars to the old gateway. The Church of St Christophe dates back to the 11th and 12th centuries; there is a mention of the church in department archives from 1630.

Events
 Fêtes Patronal: Last weekend in July; includes repas champetre, brocante, bicycle race, fireworks, fun fair and parade
 Fêtes de Château Guillaume: First Sunday in October
 Christmas market at Château Guillaume on 25 November with local produce, crafts, a special Mass and meal
 Bastille Day lamb barbecue at Lignac "Fanny" pétanque club

Organizations
 The "Fanny" pétanque club meets most Saturdays in the centre of the village
 The U.S. Lignac football club plays in the departmental 4th division
 Familles Rurales: Activities such as gymnastics, painting, calligraphy and children's activities most Wednesdays
 Blood donors
 Lignac Hunt (Société de Chasse)
 Fishing
 Tennis

Population

See also
Communes of the Indre department

References

 Blanchaued et al., Lignac entre Brenne et Boichand-Sud 1850-1950 (2007)

External links

English-language tourist site
Club Fanny Petanque Lignac (in French)

Communes of Indre